"The One Where No One's Ready" is the second episode of the third season of the American television sitcom Friends and 50th overall, which aired on NBC on September 26, 1996. The plot centers on Ross's (David Schwimmer) anxiety as his friends take too long getting ready for a function that evening.

The episode was written by Ira Ungerleider and directed by Gail Mancuso.  It is a bottle episode, featuring only three speaking roles besides the central cast; occurs in real time; and takes place almost entirely in the living room of Monica and Rachel's apartment.

Plot
Chandler (Matthew Perry) tricks Joey (Matt LeBlanc) into drinking chicken fat from a glass in Monica's (Courteney Cox) fridge as he admits after Joey drinks it that he fell for the same thing and drank the chicken fat earlier. Ross (David Schwimmer) arrives to gather everyone together for an important function at his museum. Despite only 22 minutes remaining for them to don their formal attire, no one else is ready, apart from Phoebe (Lisa Kudrow) who arrives fully dressed and ready to go.

When Monica returns, she checks her answering-machine messages and hears a message from her ex-boyfriend Richard (Tom Selleck). She is unable to determine whether the message was left before or after they broke up. After Chandler comes back from the bathroom, he is dismayed to find that Joey took his chair while he was up. They argue over the chair until Joey accidentally flings hummus onto Phoebe's dress. She tries to ask Monica what gets out hummus, but Monica is too distracted with her own problems. Rachel (Jennifer Aniston) then tries to find something else for Phoebe to wear, but is unsuccessful.
 
In a fit of insecurity, Monica breaks into Richard's voicemail, and hears a message left by another woman, leading her to believe that Richard has already begun seeing someone else. Chandler suggests the woman might be Richard's daughter Michelle, and Monica confirms this by prank-calling her. Michelle calls her back, and Monica admits her indiscretions. She is unable to secure Michelle's silence on the matter, so Chandler and Phoebe are left yanking her off the second phone in her bedroom.

Ross orders Chandler to get dressed. When he does, Joey surrenders the chair but takes its cushions with him. Phoebe eventually finds a Christmas ribbon meant to garnish a present in Rachel's room and wears that on her dress to cover the stain. Rachel is the only one almost ready to go, but she cannot decide on what to wear, trying Ross's patience. Eventually he snaps and yells at her in front of everyone, demanding that she pick out any outfit at all so that they can go. In response, Rachel emerges in sweat pants, having lost interest in attending the function.

Unbeknownst to Joey, Chandler has already taken his revenge by hiding all of Joey's underwear, forcing him to go commando in a rented tux. Joey promises to do the "opposite" of Chandler hiding his underwear, and emerges wearing everything Chandler owns (and still without underwear). Ross finally steps in and bans them from the function, and apologetically asks Rachel what he can do to make it up to her, to which Joey suggests that he drink the glass of chicken fat. Ross agrees, but Rachel stops him just in time. Overwhelmed by the depths of his love for her, she dresses in record time while Ross sorts out Joey and Chandler's argument, and Monica makes her final disastrous access to Richard's answering machine. She breaks into his voicemail again to erase all his messages and record a new one. However, she accidentally deletes and re-records his outgoing message, humiliating herself.

Finally, Rachel and Ross are the only ones in the apartment, with five seconds to spare. They kiss, but Rachel hurries them out the door to make sure they are not late—but not before telling him she is going commando too.

Over the credits, Professor Sherman Whitfield (Peter Dennis) joins Ross' table to congratulate him. When Chandler returns, he declares that Whitfield is in his seat, culminating in his demanding the professor's underwear.

Production
The bottle episode format of the series was conceived by executive producer Kevin S. Bright as a way of saving money for other episodes by using a single set and no guest stars. The success of this episode led to the format being used at least once per season thereafter, with episodes including "The One with Monica's Thunder" and "The One on the Last Night" being based solely around the six core cast. Bright believes these episodes were some of the best of the series.  This is also the only episode of Friends to take place in "real time".

Matt LeBlanc dislocated his shoulder during one take of the stunt where Joey and Chandler race towards the chair, landing upside down as a result, with the audience assuming it was part of the act. The injury was not edited into the episode, but for the following two episodes, LeBlanc's injury was written into the show as Joey dislocating his shoulder while jumping on his bed. Production on the episode was temporarily halted, and completed once LeBlanc recovered.

Reception
Entertainment Weekly notes that the episode "owes a large stylistic debt to Seinfeld", specifically citing the 1991 episode "The Chinese Restaurant", which also plays out in real time. It rates the episode C and calls the answering machine gag "derivative of George Costanza". The authors of Friends Like Us: The Unofficial Guide to Friends call it "forgettable"; "The script is dull and the performers seem to know it, with none of them trying particularly hard to make it work". Allmovie says it "stands out for the way it realistically portrays how group inertia can slow you down".

Popular reaction is more positive; the episode appeared on one of the first region 1 "best of" DVD releases and it was voted the third most popular episode in an NBC poll in 2004.  Joey's use of the phrase "going commando," which originated in the U.S. on college campuses in the early 1970s, became a popular catchphrase, especially with sports-related media.

Parody
Part of this episode was recreated, line for line, in the video for Moonlight, a song from 4:44 by Jay-Z, featuring an all-black cast. The recreation is detailed - the setting, the shots and the costumes are the same - but the theme song is Friends by Whodini instead of I'll Be There for You by The Rembrandts. Jerrod Carmichael is Ross, Issa Rae is Rachel, Tiffany Haddish is Phoebe, Lakeith Stanfield is Chandler, Lil Rel Howery is Joey, and Tessa Thompson is Monica.

References

External links
 

1996 American television episodes
Friends (season 3) episodes
Bottle television episodes